Chris Lewis may refer to:

Chris Lewis (tennis) (born 1957), New Zealand retired professional tennis player
Chris Lewis (footballer) (born 1969), Aboriginal Australian rules footballer with the West Coast Eagles
Chris Lewis (cricketer) (born 1968), England former international and county cricketer
Chris Lewis (Usenet) (active from 2002), Canadian Internet authority
Chris Lewis (police commissioner) (born 1957), Ontario Provincial Police commissioner
Chris Lewis (politician) (born 1975/76), Canadian MP
Christopher Lewis (tennis) (born 1956), also known as Chris Lewis, American tennis player
Chris Lewis (rugby league), rugby league player for the Melbourne Storm

See also
Chris Louis (born 1969), speedway rider
Christopher Lewis (disambiguation)